4/2 may refer to:
April 2 (month-day date notation)
February 4 (day-month date notation)
A time signature